Women in Informal Employment: Globalizing and Organizing (WIEGO) is a Manchester-based global research - policy network focused on improving conditions for workers in the informal economy. WIEGO's members include membership-based organizations of workers in the informal economy, researchers and development professionals. 

The WIEGO network was founded in 1997 by a group of ten activists, researchers, and development practitioners, following a specialist's meeting on the informal economy in Bellagio, Italy. Among the founders was Professor Martha Chen, a Harvard Lecturer in Public Policy and currently a senior advisor with the network. The founding steering committee chair was Indian civil rights leader Dr. Ela Bhatt.

In July 2007, WIEGO was registered as a not-for-profit company limited by guarantee in the UK (WIEGO Ltd.) with a formal Constitution and Articles of Association. In 2011, WIEGO was granted charity status by the Charity Commission for England and Wales (Registered Charity No. 1143510).

Mission and Goals
WIEGO's stated mission: "WIEGO believes all workers should have equal economic opportunities and rights and be able to determine the conditions of their work and lives. WIEGO works to improve the status of the working poor, especially women, in the informal economy through increased organization and representation; improved statistics and research; more inclusive policy processes; and more equitable trade, labour, urban, and social protection policies."

WIEGO's objectives, as detailed in the Register of Charities, are "to relieve poverty in particular the poverty of the working poor in the informal economy caused by low earnings, high risks, and adverse working environments and conditions associated with the informal economy worldwide (including non-standard or unprotected employment for formal firms)".

Programmes and Activities
WIEGO supports working poor women by aiming to ensure they have adequate information, knowledge and tools and can mobilize around their rights, enhancing their safety and their earnings.
 
WIEGO does not set an agenda but rather supports domestic workers, street vendors, waste pickers, garment workers, smallholder farmers and others in articulating their own demands and participating directly in policy and planning processes.

Specific Research and Action
WIEGO commissions research that focuses on improving statistics on, and analyzing policies relating to, the working poor who make their living in the informal economy. Membership-based organizations (MBOs) of informal workers are always involved in the identification, prioritization and design of WIEGO activities.

Impact of Global Recession: In 2009 and again in 2010, WIEGO coordinated Global Economic Crisis studies to determine how informal workers were being affected by the global economic downturn. The study was executed by organizations involved in the global Inclusive Cities project, which is funded by the Bill & Melinda Gates Foundation. Two rounds of interviews and focus groups were conducted with 102 home-based workers, 63 street vendors and 54 waste pickers in 14 cities across Africa, Asia and Latin America. In 2009, 77% of respondents reported their incomes had fallen in recent months, while 52% reported another decrease between mid-2009 and 2010.

Findings from the first study, completed in 2009, are captured in  "No Cushion to Fall Back On: The Global Economic Crisis and Informal Workers". Findings from the second study are found in "Coping with Crises: Lingering Recession, Rising Inflation, and the Informal Workforce". 

Domestic Workers' Rights: From 2009-2011, funding from the Government of Netherlands MDG3 Fund allowed WIEGO to assist domestic workers in their struggle for an international convention that would help secure their rights as workers. WIEGO  helped establish the International Domestic Workers'  Network (IDWN), and provided technical and strategic advice, research and capacity building, as well as assisting the IDWN in fund raising. Such practical support allowed domestic workers to represent themselves at the International Labour Conference (ILC) in 2010 and 2011. On June 16, 2011 governments, employers and workers from around the world adopted the Convention and accompanying Recommendation on Decent Work for Domestic Workers (Convention 189) at the 100th ILC in Geneva, Switzerland.

Structure
WIEGO represents a collaboration between membership-based organizations of workers in the informal economy, support non-governmental organizations, research and statistics institutions, national governments, and international development agencies.

Membership-based organizations of informal workers that are actively involved with WIEGO are asked to become Institutional Members. Individuals from the other two constituencies who are involved with WIEGO can become Individual Members. As of March 2014, the WIEGO network had 172 Members – 33 Institutional and 139 Individual Members – from 40 countries.

A 10-person Board of Directors governs the WIEGO network. Board members are drawn from WIEGO's three constituencies. The Board has two committees: a Management (or executive) Committee and a Financial Committee.

Mirai Chatterjee (Chair), Self-Employed Women's Association (SEWA)/India
 Lin Lim Lean, Independent Consultant/Malaysia
 Barbo Budin
 William Steel, University of Ghana/Ghana
 Debra Davis
 Luciana Fukimoto Itikawa, Independent Consultant/Brazil
 Patrick Ndlovu
 Uma Rani, International Labour Organisation, India
 Elizabeth Tang
 Gabriela Calandria, StreetNet International/AFFE, Uruguay

Key Funders
 The Bill and Melinda Gates Foundation
 Department for International Development (DFID)
 The Ford Foundation
 The Hewlett Foundation
 Government of the Netherlands, MDG3 Fund
 International Development Research Centre (IDRC)
 Swedish International Development Cooperation Agency (Sida)

Notes

External links

Non-profit organizations based in the United States
Harvard University
Charities based in the United Kingdom
Environmental justice organizations